Plotovinka is a rural locality (a settlement) in Sizobugorsky Selsoviet of Volodarsky District, Astrakhan Oblast, Russia. The population was 175 as of 2010. There are 2 streets.

Geography 
It is located on the Bushma River, 28 km south of Volodarsky (the district's administrative centre) by road. Sizy Bugor is the nearest rural locality.

References 

Rural localities in Volodarsky District, Astrakhan Oblast